Zuya is an urban-type settlement in the Bilohirsk Raion of Crimea. Population:

References

External links
 

Bilohirsk Raion
Urban-type settlements in Crimea